Ischnus is a genus of parasitoid wasps belonging to the family Ichneumonidae.

The genus has almost cosmopolitan distribution.

Species:
 Ischnus agitator (Olivier, 1792)
 Ischnus alpinicola Heinrich, 1951

References

Ichneumonidae
Ichneumonidae genera